The Universe class is a series of 6 container ships built for COSCO SHIPPING Lines. The ships have a maximum theoretical capacity of 21,237 TEU. They are some of the largest container ships ever built and was the second class of ships to exceed 21,000 TEU of capacity after the OOCL G-class (21,413 TEU). At the time they were also the largest Chinese built container ships.  

The ships were built by Shanghai Waigaoqiao Shipbuilding at the Jiangnan Shipyard in Shanghai. They were originally ordered for a 12 year charter by China Shipping Container Lines (CSCL). In 2016, a merger took place in which CSCL and its fleet became part of COSCO. This happened well before the ships would be finished and as a result the ships were all delivered with COSCO Shipping name and colors.

List of ships

See also 

 Constellation-class container ship

References 

Container ship classes
Ships of COSCO Shipping